Anthony Julius "Tony" Brummet (born March 31, 1931) was an educator and political figure in British Columbia. He represented North Peace River from 1979 to 1991 in the Legislative Assembly of British Columbia as a Social Credit member.

He was born in Mendham, Saskatchewan, the son of Gordon F. Brummet and Maria Potter, and was educated at the University of British Columbia. In 1952, he married Audrey A. Smith. Brummet lived in Fort St. John, British Columbia. He was a school principal before entering politics. Brummet served in the provincial cabinet as Minister of Lands, Parks and Housing, as Minister of Environment and as Minister of Education.

References

External links 
 

1931 births
British Columbia Social Credit Party MLAs
Living people
Members of the Executive Council of British Columbia
People from Fort St. John, British Columbia
People from Rural Municipality Happyland No. 231, Saskatchewan
Heads of schools in Canada